William Alfred (August 16, 1922 – May 20, 1999) was an American playwright, poet, and professor of English literature at Harvard University.

Biography 
Alfred was born into an Irish family in Brooklyn, New York. His father was a bricklayer and his mother was a telephone operator. He graduated from St. Francis Preparatory School in 1940.

Alfred was drafted in 1943, two years into his undergraduate studies at Brooklyn College. He served in the Army tank corps and quartermaster's corps in World War II for four years. While in the army, he was taught Bulgarian at a language school and then stationed in the South Pacific, where he wrote poems for American Poet. Alfred completed his B.A. from Brooklyn College in 1948 with the help of the G.I. Bill.

Alfred is a double graduate of Harvard University, where he specialized in the literature of Medieval England, receiving his A.M. and Ph.D. in English in 1949 and 1954 respectively. While at Harvard, Alfred took a creative writing course under Archibald MacLeish, where he wrote his play, Agamemnon.

He began teaching at Harvard the same year he received his doctorate and was appointed full professor in 1963. In 1980, he was named Abbott Lawrence Lowell Professor of the Humanities.

He retired in 1991.

Personal life 
Alfred was a lifelong Catholic and attended mass at nearby Saint Paul's Church.

His great grandmother, Anna Maria Egan, immigrated to the United States.

Alfred's play Hogan's Goat helped launch Faye Dunaway's career in the 60's. They maintained a close relationship and remained lifelong friends.

Alfred was close friends with fellow poets Elizabeth Bishop and Robert Lowell.

Plays
Agamemnon (published 1954)
 Hogan's Goat (published 1966)
 Cry for Us All (musical adaptation of Hogan's Goat)
The Curse of an Aching Heart

Other works
The Annunciation Rosary (poetry)
Author of a translation of Beowulf

Awards and recognition 

 1993 Harvard Medal
 1988 Signet Society Medal for Lifetime Achievement
 1957 Phi Beta Kappa Poet of Harvard University
 1954 Amy Lowell Traveling Poetry Scholar

References

External links
The William Alfred Collection at Brooklyn College Special Collections
Guide to William Alfred papers concerning adaptations of Agamemnon and The Scarlet Letter at Houghton Library, Harvard University
{https://sites.google.com/view/the-friends-of-william-alfred/home  The New Friends of William Alfred, A collection of photos, videos, memoirs, and external links devoted to the life and works of William Alfred.

1922 births
American academics of English literature
Harvard Graduate School of Arts and Sciences alumni
Harvard University faculty
1999 deaths
20th-century American non-fiction writers
Brooklyn College alumni
United States Army personnel of World War II